Tarlac's 1st congressional district is one of the three congressional districts of the Philippines in the province of Tarlac. It has been represented in the House of Representatives of the Philippines since 1916 and earlier in the Philippine Assembly from 1907 to 1916. The district consists of the northern Tarlac municipalities of Anao, Camiling, Mayantoc, Moncada, Paniqui, Pura, Ramos, San Clemente, San Manuel and Santa Ignacia. It is currently represented in the 18th Congress by Jaime D. Cojuangco of the Nationalist People's Coalition (NPC).

Representation history

Election results

2022

2019

2016

2013

2010

See also
Legislative districts of Tarlac

References

Congressional districts of the Philippines
Politics of Tarlac
1907 establishments in the Philippines
Congressional districts of Central Luzon
Constituencies established in 1907